Bolesławiec  is a village in Wieruszów County, Łódź Voivodeship, in south-central Poland. It is the seat of the gmina (administrative district) called Gmina Bolesławiec.

The village has an approximate population of 900.

History

The town and castle were founded by Duke of Greater Poland Bolesław the Pious of the Piast dynasty. The town was named after him. The castle was captured by King John of Bohemia, but was regained by Polish King Casimir III the Great in 1335. Casimir III then partially rebuilt and strengthened the castle. During the Swedish invasion of Poland of 1655–1660, it was captured by the Swedes, however, it was later renovated by local starost Jan Radziejowski.

Following the joint German-Soviet invasion of Poland, which started World War II in 1939, Bolesławiec was occupied by Germany. Before the war, more than 500 Jews lived in Bolesławiec. Until August 1941, the village's Jews were murdered by the occupiers in the Holocaust, and some were deported to larger Jewish concentrations in the area, and they too were eventually murdered. The occupiers initially renamed the village to Klein Buntzlau, and in 1943, to Bolkenburg. After the end of German occupation in 1945, the original name was restored.

References

Villages in Wieruszów County
Sieradz Voivodeship (1339–1793)
Kalisz Governorate
Łódź Voivodeship (1919–1939)
Jewish communities destroyed in the Holocaust